Voice from the Past – Paradigm is an album by American jazz bassist Gary Peacock recorded in 1981 and released on the ECM label.

Reception
The Allmusic review by David R. Adler awarded the album 3 stars stating "The interplay between Peacock and DeJohnette, captured roughly two years before the release of the first Keith Jarrett standards record, is especially interesting. One only wishes the horns weren't so tinny".

Track listing
All compositions by Gary Peacock
 "Voice From The Past" - 11:00   
 "Legends" - 7:40   
 "Moor" - 4:58   
 "Allegory" - 9:35   
 "Paradigm" - 6:44   
 "Ode for Tomten" - 9:25  
Recorded at Talent Studio in Oslo, Norway in August 1981.

Personnel
 Gary Peacock — bass
 Jan Garbarek — tenor saxophone, soprano saxophone
Tomasz Stańko — trumpet
Jack DeJohnette — drums

References

ECM Records albums
Gary Peacock albums
1982 albums
Albums produced by Manfred Eicher